Isdera Commendatore can refer to two motor vehicles manufactured by Isdera:

 Isdera Commendatore 112i (1993–1999)
 Isdera Commendatore GT (2018–present)

Commendatore